The 2nd Engineer Brigade was a military engineering brigade of the United States Army, that was subordinate to United States Army Alaska and had its headquarters at Fort Richardson, Alaska, prior to deactivation in 2015.

History

World War II
The 2nd Engineer Amphibian Brigade was activated at Camp Edwards on 20 June 1942, with the 532nd Engineer Shore Regiment and 592nd Engineer Boat Regiment assigned. Colonel William F. Heavey, who was appointed its commander on 6 August 1942, and was promoted to brigadier general on 10 September, led the brigade for the rest of the war. It quickly expanded to 6,000 men, but lost 1,500 in September to the 540th Shore Regiment. On 1 October, the brigade was reorganized; the 532nd and 592nd became engineer amphibian regiments and the 542nd Engineer Amphibian Regiment was formed. The brigade, less the 542nd Engineer Amphibian Regiment, moved by rail to Camp Carrabelle on 15 October. On 7 November, the brigade moved to Fort Ord, California, where it was joined by the 542nd Engineer Amphibian Regiment the following day. In January and February 1943, the brigade embarked from the San Francisco Port of Embarkation on a series of vessels bound for Australia.

The brigade helped the 411th Base Shop Battalion establish a landing craft construction facility, which produced its first finished LCVP on 7 April. In May, elements of the brigade began moving to New Guinea. A detachment of ten LCMs of the 592nd Engineer Amphibian Regiment went to Port Moresby, where it moved supplies to the Lakekamu River. They were followed by detachments of the 532nd and 542nd, which moved to Milne Bay, Oro Bay and Samarai. On 30 June, the brigade participated in its first amphibious operation, the landing at Nassau Bay. On 4 July, the brigade was renamed the 2nd Engineer Special Brigade, and its three regiments became engineer boat and shore regiments.

The 2nd Engineer Special Brigade trained at Cairns with the Australian 9th Division in June and July 1943. The 532nd Engineer Boat and Shore Regiment then moved to New Guinea, and landed part of the 9th Division at Red Beach near Lae on 4 September. On 22 September, it landed elements of the 9th Division at Scarlet Beach near Finschhafen. On 11 October, four Japanese barges attempted to land on Scarlet Beach. They were defeated by men of the 532nd Engineer Boat and Shore Regiment, including Private Junior Van Noy, who was posthumously awarded the Medal of Honor.

Over the next few months, units of the 2nd Engineer Special Brigade participated in the landings at Arawe, Long Island, Saidor, Sio, Los Negros, Talasea, Hollandia, Wakde and Biak. On 20 October 1944 it participated in the amphibious assault on Leyte in the Philippines. Over the following months it participated in a series of amphibious operations to liberate the Philippines. Nine of the 2nd Engineer Special Brigade's units were awarded Presidential Unit Citations.

Organization
 Brigade Headquarters
 532nd Engineer Boat and Shore Regiment
 542nd Engineer Boat and Shore Regiment
 592nd Engineer Boat and Shore Regiment
 562nd Engineer Boat Maintenance Battalion 
 1458th Engineer Maintenance Company
 1459th Engineer Maintenance Company
 1460th Engineer Maintenance Company
 1570th Engineer Heavy Equipment Shop Company
 1762nd Engineer Parts Supply Platoon 
 262nd Medical Battalion
 162nd Ordnance Maintenance Company
 189th Quartermaster Gas Supply Company
 287th Signal Company
 695th Truck Company
 3498th Ordnance Medium Maintenance Company
 5204th Transportation Corps Amphibious Truck Company
 Medical Detachment, 2nd Engineer Special Brigade  
 Support Battery (Provisional) 2nd Engineer Special Brigade
 416th Army Service Forces Band

Korean War
The 2nd Engineer Special Brigade arrived back in San Francisco on 16 December 1945, and returned to Fort Ord. It later moved to Fort Worden, Washington, where it was stationed when the Korean War broke out in June 1950. The brigade moved to Yokohama, Japan, and participated in the landing at Inchon in September 1950. Afterwards it operated the ports of Suyong and Ulsan. The brigade was redesignated as the 2nd Amphibious Support Brigade on 26 June 1952. In December 1953 it moved to Camp McGill in Japan, where it was inactivated on 24 June 1955.

The brigade was reactivated at Fort Belvoir, Virginia as the 2nd Amphibious Support Command, on 13 November 1956, and inactivated at Fort Story, Virginia, on 25 August 1965.

Afghanistan
The brigade was reactivated as the 2nd Engineer Brigade from the 3rd Maneuver Enhancement Brigade, on 16 September 2011. Although no longer an amphibian brigade, it wore the World War II-era seahorse emblem until inactivated there on 15 May 2015.

Structure in 2011
  2nd Engineer Brigade
  17th Combat Sustainment Support Battalion
  6th Engineer Battalion
  793rd Military Police Battalion
  9th Army Band
 United States Army Alaska NCO Academy

References

Bibliography
 

 
 
 

Engineer Brigades of the United States Army
United States Army Corps of Engineers
Military units and formations established in 1942